Grand Ayatollah Sayyid Abu al-Qasim al-Musawi al-Khoei (November 19, 1899 – August 8, 1992) was an Iranian-Iraqi Shia marja'. Al-Khoei is considered one of the most influential twelver scholars. 

After the death of Muhsin al-Hakim, he became the spiritual leader of much of the Shia world until his death in 1992. He was succeeded briefly by Abd al-A'la al-Sabziwari, until his death in 1993. Then his former student, Ali al-Sistani, took leadership of the seminary, whereby many of his followers became followers of al-Sistani.

Biography

Al Khoei was born in the Iranian city of Khoy, West Azerbaijan province in 1899, Khoei grew up in Iran. Around the age of 13, along with his older brother, Abdullah, he moved to Iraq and took up residence in the holy city of Najaf where he began studying Shia theology with the scholars of that city. He eventually attained the rank of Ayatollah and was subsequently made a marja. Khoei would continue to live in Najaf, becoming a teacher for the remainder of his life, and overseeing the studies of scholars who would be qualified to issue fatwas based on Shia theology.

Due to his prominent position as a teacher and scholar in Najaf, he became an important leader of worldwide Shias. He was made the most prominent Grand Ayatollah in 1971 after the death of Muhsin al-Hakim. In this position, he became a patron of numerous institutions across the globe that sought to provide welfare, and also provided scholarships to theological students from across the Muslim world.

He is considered as the architect of a distinct school of thought in the principles of jurisprudence and Islamic law, and one of the leading exponents of 'kalam'-scholastic theology- and 'rijal'- study of the biographies of transmitters of ahadith, the prophetic traditions, 'fiqh'- jurisprudence- and 'tafseer'- exegesis of the Qur'an. His interests included astronomy, mathematics, and philosophy.

Al-Khoei's status as the pre-eminent scholar of his age did not go unchallenged. In the 1970s, Grand Ayatollah Mohammed Al-Shirazi, a radical theologian based in Karbala had a long-running feud with Al Khoei and his fellow clerics in Najaf over the legitimacy of theocratic rule. The dispute resulted in Al-Khoei seeking to dismiss Al Shirazi's status as a religious scholar.

After the Persian Gulf War, Khoei was arrested by Saddam Hussein during the mass Shia uprising that followed the defeat of Iraqi forces. While under arrest, he was taken to Baghdad and forced to make public appearances with Saddam Hussein. Hussein eventually allowed Khoei to return to Najaf, but he was placed under house arrest. Khoei died on 8 August 1992 in Najaf at the age of 92. His funeral was led by his student Ali al-Sistani. He was buried in Shrine of Imam Ali in Najaf.

Legacy

Welfare

He was fervently dedicated to establishing welfare, social, cultural, and educational institutions for Muslims worldwide. The following are some of the institutions he established:

 Imam al-Khoei Islamic Center in Queens, NY.
al-Iman School in Queens, New York.
 As-Sadiq and Az-Zahra Schools in London.
 Imam al-Khoei Islamic Centre in London, U.K
 Jamia-tul-Kauthar in Islamabad.
 Darul Hikmah in Najaf.
 Madinatul Ilm in Qom. It is considered one of the biggest theology centres in the Shia world. The complex comprises the school building and living quarters capable of accommodating 500 families.
 As-Sayyid al-Khoei Centre in Bangkok.
 As-Sayyid al-Khoei Centre in Dhaka.
 Imam al-Khoei Orphanage in Beirut.
 Imam-e-Zamana Mission in Hyderabad.
 Najafi House in Mumbai.

He was also the patron of about 1,000 grant-maintained students of theology from Iraq and other countries like Lebanon, Iran, Syria, Persian Gulf States, India, Pakistan, Afghanistan, South East Asia. He provided financial support for maintaining the schools including boarding expenses, teachers' salaries, and lodging costs.

Students

Former student Ali al-Sistani is currently the most senior Shia cleric in Iraq and widely regarded as "wield[ing] enormous power over Iraq's Shia majority." The degree of success of his articulation of moderate Shia politics in Iraq have been said to be "in no small part traceable to the legacy of his mentor and teacher", al-Khoei.

Another significant student of al-Khoei, is Muhammad-Sadiq Rohani, who also shared a close relationship with al-Khoei. He was considered a high religious authorities in Iran, alongside Waheed Khurasani.

Works
Khoei wrote on various topics, ranging from Islamic jurisprudence to mathematics and astronomy and was a prolific writer in these disciplines. He wrote 37 books and treatises, most of which have been published. His works include:

 Lectures in the Principles of Jurisprudence - 10 volumes
 Biographies of Narrators of Tradition - 24 volumes.
 Islamic Law - 18 volumes.
 Al-Bayan Fi Tafsir al-Quran (The Elucidation of the Exegesis of The Qur'an and sometimes entitled The Prolegomena to the Quran)
 Minhaju-us-Saliheen (The Path of the Righteous) - 2 volumes, reprinted 78 times (guide book on religious practice and law).
 Anthology of Religious Questions - Concise version of the Path of the Righteous - in Arabic, Urdu, Persian, English, Turkish, Thai, Malay, Indonesian, and Gujarati.
 Mabani al-Istinbat (Edifices of Deduction) Principles of Jurisprudence.
 Ajwad-at-Taqrirat (The Best of Regulations) Principles of Jurisprudence.
 Sharh-el-Urwatul-Wuthqa (Commentary on The Steadfast Handle) - Jurisprudence.
 Treatise on Suspected Attire - Risala fil Libas Al-Mashkok, Evidential Jurisprudence.
 Nafahat-ul Ijaz (the Fragrance of Miracles), in defence of the Qur'an.

Internet
Imam Al-Khoei Benevolent Foundation

Personal life

al-Khoei was married and had seven sons:

 Jamal al-Din. He was al-Khoei's eldest son and spent his life in the service of his father's marja'iya. He died in Tehran after being diagnosed with cancer, in 1984. He was buried in the Fatimah Masumah shrine in Qom. His notable works are: Sharh Kifayat al-Usul, Bahth Fi al-Falsafa Wa Ilm al-Kalam, Sharh Diwan al-Mutanabi.
 Ali al-Khoei. He was killed young in a car accident between Baghdad and Najaf.
 Abbas
 Abd al-Sahib. Current secretary general of the Imam al-Khoei Foundation in London.
 Muhammad-Taqi. He was the secretary general of the Foundation in 1989. He was placed under house arrest with his father after the 1991 Shaban uprising. Muhammad-Taqi was allegedly assassinated by Saddam Hussein, who set up a car accident, on the night of 21 July 1994. Besides reports of his father's lectures, he has authored Kitab al-Iltizamat al-Taba'iya Fi al-Uqud.
 Abd al-Majid. He emigrated from Iraq soon after the Shaban uprising and left for London. He became the secretary-general of the Foundation after his brother, Muhammad-Taqi's death. Soon after the fall of Baghdad to US forces in 2003, he returned to Iraq with plans to revive Najaf to the glory and splendour it enjoyed under the patronage of his father. However, he was assassinated on April 10, 2003, near the Imam Ali Mosque in Najaf.
 Ibrahim. He was abducted from his house by the Baathist regime after the Shaban uprising, in 1991.

See also
Muhammad Kazim Khurasani
Mirza Husayn Tehrani
Abdallah Mazandarani
Muhammad Hossein Naini
Mirza Ali Aqa Tabrizi
Mirza Sayyed Mohammad Tabatabai
Seyyed Abdollah Behbahani
Fazlullah Nouri
Ruhollah Khomeini
 Islamic Government (book by Khomeini)
Abd al-A'la al-Sabziwari
Muhammad-Hadi al-Milani
Ali al-Sistani

References and notes

External links

Official website
Imam Al-Khoei Foundation

1899 births
1992 deaths
Iraqi ayatollahs
People from Khoy
Iranian emigrants to Iraq
Al-Moussawi family
Critics of Sunni Islam
Burials at Imam Ali Mosque
Biographical evaluation scholars
20th-century Iranian people
Iranian Shia clerics
Shia hadith scholars